The Judge Advocate General (JAG) of the Australian Defence Force (ADF) is an office created by the Defence Force Discipline Act (1982), held by a judge or former judge of a federal court or a state supreme court. The appointment of JAG is made by the Governor-General-in-Council. The JAG may make procedural rules for tribunals that operate within the Navy, Army, and Air Force, provide the final legal review of proceedings within the ADF, participate in the appointment of judge advocates, Defence Force magistrates, presidents and members of courts martial, and legal officers for various purposes, and reporting upon the operation of laws relating to the discipline of the ADF.

The current Judge Advocate General is Rear Admiral the Hon Jack Rush RFD QC RAN.

The JAG is assisted by three deputy judge advocates general (DJAG), one for each service:
 DJAG – Navy
 DJAG – Army
 DJAG – Air Force
The current Deputy Judge Advocates General are:

 Navy: Commodore J.T. Rush RFD RAN
 Army: Brigadier Judge Paul E. Smith
 Air Force: Air Commodore Judge GB Lerve

List of Judge Advocates General
The following individuals have been appointed as Judge Advocate General of the Australian Defence Force:

See also

 Judge Advocate General
 Military Court of Australia

References

External links
 

Legal occupations in the military
Australian military law
Military appointments of Australia
Judiciary of Australia
Military justice